This is a list of cities and towns founded by the Romans. It lists every city established and built by the ancient Romans to have begun as a colony, often for the settlement of citizens or veterans of the legions. Many Roman colonies rose to become important commercial and cultural centers, transportation hubs and capitals of global empires.

Cities founded by the Romans

Cities not founded by the Romans, but which have gained importance with them

See also

 Romanization
 Legacy of the Roman Empire
 Ancient Rome
 Roman Empire
Roman colonies in antiquity

References

 
Ancient Roman geography
History of the Roman Empire
Legacy of the Roman Empire
Cities founded by Rome
Cities